"(Don't Go Back To) Rockville" is the second and final single released by American rock band R.E.M. from their second studio album, Reckoning. The song failed to chart on either the Billboard Hot 100 or the UK Singles Charts.

Background 
The song was written by Mike Mills (credited to Berry/Buck/Mills/Stipe), in 1980, as a plea to his then-girlfriend, Ingrid Schorr, not to return to Rockville, Maryland, where her parents lived. Schorr, who later became a journalist, has written about her amusement with the factual inaccuracies about her relationship with Mills and the background of the song that often appear in books about the band. Peter Buck has stated that the song was originally performed in a punk/thrash style, and that it was recorded for this single in its now more-familiar country-inspired arrangement as a joke aimed at R.E.M. manager Bertis Downs.

Over time, Mike Mills has taken over lead vocals instead of Michael Stipe when the band has played the song live. On R.E.M.'s appearance on VH1 Storytellers in 1998, Mills performed the song solo on piano. A live version of the song was released as the B-side to "Leaving New York" in 2004 and on R.E.M. Live in 2007.

Twelve years after originally written, alternative rock band 10,000 Maniacs included a cover version as the fourth track on their 1992 single "Candy Everybody Wants".

Track listings 
All songs written by Bill Berry, Peter Buck, Mike Mills and Michael Stipe.

European singles

"(Don't Go Back To) Rockville" (Edit) – 3:55
"Wolves, Lower" – 4:14
"9-9" (Live)1 (12" only)
"Gardening at Night" (Live)1 (12" only)

US singles

"(Don't Go Back To) Rockville" (Edit) – 3:55
"Catapult" (Live)2

Notes 
1 Recorded at the Theater El Dorado, Paris, France, April 20, 1984.
2 Recorded at the Music Hall, Seattle, Washington, June 27, 1984.

References

External links
“Behind the Song: ‘(Don’t Go Back To) Rockville’ by R.E.M.” from American Songwriter
Ingrid Schorr on the song

R.E.M. songs
Rockville, Maryland
Songs written by Bill Berry
Songs written by Peter Buck
Songs written by Mike Mills
Songs written by Michael Stipe
I.R.S. Records singles
1984 singles
Songs based on actual events
Song recordings produced by Don Dixon (musician)
Song recordings produced by Mitch Easter
Country rock songs
1984 songs